Batman: The Animated Series (often shortened as Batman TAS or BTAS) is an American superhero animated television series based on the DC Comics superhero Batman. Developed by Bruce Timm and Eric Radomski, and produced by Warner Bros. Animation, it originally aired on Fox Kids from September 5, 1992 to September 15, 1995 with a total of 85 episodes. After the series ended its original run, a follow-up titled The New Batman Adventures began airing on Kids' WB in 1997 as a continuation of the series, featuring a revamped animation style. Lasting 24 episodes, it has often been included in the same syndicated re-run packages and home media releases.

Batman: The Animated Series received critical acclaim for its darker tone, mature writing, thematic complexity, artistic presentation, voice acting, orchestrated soundtrack, and modernization of its title character's source material. The series also won multiple Daytime Emmy Awards, as well as the Primetime Emmy Award for Outstanding Animated Programming.

The series became the first in the continuity of the shared DC Animated Universe, which spawned further animated TV series, feature films, comic books and video games with much of the same creative talent, including the 1993 theatrical release Batman: Mask of the Phantasm. Another continuation of the series is in development in the form of an audio podcast drama, with most of the cast returning along with writer Alan Burnett.

Overview
The series took influence from Tim Burton's live-action films, Batman (1989) and Batman Returns (1992), and the acclaimed Superman theatrical cartoons produced by Fleischer Studios in the early 1940s. In designing the series, Bruce Timm and Eric Radomski emulated the Burton films' "otherworldly timelessness", incorporating period features such as black-and-white title cards, police airships and a "vintage" color scheme with film noir flourishes.

The visual style of the series was based on the artwork of Radomski, and the gothic look of Gotham City was derived from his initial designs. In addition, Radomski issued a standing order to the animation department that all backgrounds be painted using light colors on black paper (as opposed to the industry standard of dark colors on white paper). The distinctive visual combination of "noir" imagery and Art Deco design was dubbed "Dark Deco" by the producers.

The series initially took a variation of music written by Danny Elfman for the Burton films as its theme; later episodes of the series used a new theme with a similar style by Shirley Walker, an occasional collaborator of Elfman. The score of the series was influenced by Elfman's work on the Burton films, as well as music of 1940s film noir.

The series is more adult-oriented than many previous superhero cartoons, though still considered appropriate for younger viewers. It depicts outright physical violence against antagonists, including realistic firearms (though only one character, Commissioner Gordon, was ever depicted as having been shot, in the episode "I Am the Night"). First-time producers Timm and Radomski reportedly encountered resistance from studio executives, but the success of Burton's first film allowed the embryonic series to survive long enough to produce a pilot episode, "On Leather Wings", which, according to Timm, "got a lot of people off our backs". During the series' production, producer Alan Burnett wrote an episode without dialogue entitled "Silent Night" to explore more of Batman's sexual life, but this was never produced. Burnett also intended to make an episode featuring a female vampire that would bite Batman to suck his blood, but plans never materialized.

The series is also notable for its supporting cast. Numerous known actors provided voices for a variety of recognizable villains. Most notable was Mark Hamill, previously famous for his role as Luke Skywalker in the original Star Wars trilogy, whose prominence as a voice actor was heightened through his "cheerfully deranged" portrayal of the Joker. The role was originally given to Tim Curry, but he developed bronchitis during the initial recording sessions. John Glover, who later voiced the Riddler, also auditioned for the Joker role. Hamill, who found himself to be the biggest fan of the Batman comics among the cast, credited the laughs he had honed on stage in Amadeus with landing him the role. The recording sessions, under the supervision of voice director Andrea Romano, were recorded with the actors together in one studio instead of taking separate recordings, as is typical. This method would later be employed for all subsequent series in the DC Animated Universe. Al Pacino was considered to voice Two-Face in the series, but he declined the offer; Richard Moll was instead cast in the role. Other actors included Ron Perlman as Clayface, Roddy McDowall as the Mad Hatter, David Warner as Ra's al Ghul, Michael York as Count Vertigo, Kate Mulgrew as Red Claw, George Murdock as Boss Biggis, Ed Asner as Roland Daggett and George Dzundza as the Ventriloquist.

One of the series' best-known inventions is the Joker's assistant, Harley Quinn, who became so popular that DC Comics later added her to mainstream comic book continuity. The Penguin underwent change for the series; his appearance was remodeled after the version seen in Batman Returns, which was in production simultaneously with the series' first season. New life was also given to lesser-known characters for the series, such as the Clock King. In addition, dramatic changes were made to other villains such as Clayface and Mr. Freeze, the latter of whom was changed from a gimmicky mad scientist to a tragic figure whose "frigid exterior [hid] a doomed love and vindictive fury".

Characters
The Joker's accomplice Harley Quinn, Gotham City police detective Renee Montoya, the vigilante Lock-Up, former actor Simon Trent, brainwashed comedian-turned-supervillain Condiment King, and ninja Kyodai Ken are original creations who became characters in the comics. Older villains that were lesser known from the comics, such as Count Vertigo, the Mirror Man and the Clock King, were modified for the series in both appearance and personality. Other original antagonists were created, such as Roland Daggett, Red Claw, the Sewer King, Boss Biggis, Grant Walker, H.A.R.D.A.C., and Emile Dorian, but to little acclaim, and did not make any appearances outside the series, though Daggett was re-imagined as businessman John Daggett for The Dark Knight Rises.

Though the Joker's origin is never shown in the series (one of only two villains in the series who never got an origin episode, the other one being The Penguin), some of his past is seen in the feature film Batman: Mask of the Phantasm. In flashbacks, he is shown before his accident but does not speak or is referred to by name. His potential real name, Jack Napier (the same name of Jack Nicholson's version of the character from Tim Burton's 1989 film), is established in the episodes "Dreams in Darkness" when it is spoken by Dr. Bartholomew and in "Joker's Wild" where it is written in a dossier. The use of this origin was due to the show being heavily patterned after the success and influential tone of Tim Burton's film. However, when The New Batman Adventures began, during the era of Joel Schumacher's films, Joker's origin was retained but his identity was retconned as being merely one of many aliases as seen in the episode "Beware the Creeper", meaning his true identity is still unknown. This reflected the efforts of the writers to put the character back in line with his conflicting multiple origins from the comics.

While the use of this origin was based on the Jack Nicholson version, Mark Hamill was given the note "Don't do Nicholson" before his audition. During production, Hamill asked the production team (consisting of Timm, Radomski, and Romano) if he could play one of the villains after a small appearance as Ferris Boyle in “Heart of Ice”. Even though Tim Curry had already recorded a few episodes, Hamill was given the part after Curry developed bronchitis and departed the series. Hamill, who found himself to be the biggest fan of the Batman comics among the cast, credited the laughs he had honed on stage in Amadeus with landing him the role. He worked to craft a multifaceted laugh for the Joker that could change to reflect the Joker's current mood, likening it to a musical instrument. When recording his lines with the other actors, Hamill would stand while the other actors would remain seated to invest himself in the role. Hamill's take on the Joker's laugh (and the role in general) is considered to be groundbreaking for the voice-acting industry, and led to Hamill having an enormously successful voice-acting career. Of the many influences for his performance, including Jay Leno and Howard Cosell, Hamill cited Claude Rains' performance in the 1933 film The Invisible Man.

Aside from creating characters that crossed over into the main line of DC Comics, several of the series' reinterpretations were carried over as well. Mr. Freeze was revised in the comics to emulate the series' tragic story, the success of which actually compelled DC to bring the character back after "killing" him off some years earlier. Clayface was revised to be much more similar in appearance to his animated counterpart; and Two-Face's double-sided, black-and-white suit has become a common appearance for the character.

Bruce Wayne / Batman

At the age of eight, Bruce Wayne, the son of billionaire philanthropists, witnessed the murder of his parents, Thomas and Martha, during a mugging on the street. The event left him traumatized and mentally scarred for the rest of his life. This left Bruce to be cared for by his family's butler, Alfred Pennyworth. Over the years, Bruce slowly turned the pain and trauma he sustained into a burning fuel for a lifelong obsession, as he underwent rigorous training in mental and physical conditioning, the martial arts, criminology, sciences, manhunting, forensics, detective work, interrogation methods and intimidation, for the next years of his life. Having observed the rampant crime and corruption across Gotham City, he chose to deal with the crime-wave in Gotham in his own way, by using his years of training and swore an oath to dedicate his entire life to fighting crime, in a bid to avenge the murder of his parents and to use his pain and suffering to drive him to do good, while being guided by his self-enforced moral code to never kill and to refrain from using firearms. Inspired by the presence of bats, his childhood fear, which used to be present around his home, Bruce chose to undertake the alias of The Batman, a feared, near-mythical and bat-masked vigilante.

Kevin Conroy used different voices to distinguish between his portrayal of Bruce Wayne and Batman, a tactic used previously by Michael Keaton in Tim Burton's live-action films. Conroy based his dual-voice performance on the 1934 film adaptation of The Scarlet Pimpernel.

Other characters
Other antagonists that appeared in the series included classic villains such as Poison Ivy, Catwoman, the Riddler, Two-Face, the Mad Hatter, Ra's al Ghul, Talia al Ghul, Man-Bat, the Penguin, the Scarecrow, Killer Croc, Bane, the Ventriloquist and his dummy Scarface, Hugo Strange and Tony Zucco. Friends and allies of Batman featured in the show not previously mentioned include Alfred Pennyworth, Harvey Bullock, the Gray Ghost (an original character created by the series to portray Bruce Wayne's childhood hero and crimefighting inspiration, voiced by Adam West, the actor who had played Batman in the 1960s Batman series), Lucius Fox, and Leslie Thompkins.

Cast

Protagonists

Supporting protagonists

Antagonists

Supporting antagonists

Episodes

Animation
In order to complete the first season's 65 episodes, Warner Bros. Animation outsourced the series to several different overseas animation houses: Spectrum Animation, Sunrise, Studio Junio and Tokyo Movie Shinsha in Japan, Dong Yang Animation, Koko Enterprises Ltd. and AKOM in South Korea, Jade Animation in Hong Kong, Blue Pencil in Spain and Network of Animation (NOA) in Canada. TMS also animated the first season's opening theme sequence. AKOM was eventually fired due to its inconsistent animation in many episodes such as "Cat Scratch Fever" and "Moon of the Wolf".

The 20 episodes of the second season were animated largely by Dong Yang, with the exception of three done by Studio Junio ("A Bullet for Bullock", "Avatar" and "Baby-Doll") and one done by Jade Animation ("The Terrible Trio").

On the commentary track for "Heart of Ice" on the Batman: The Animated Series, Volume One DVD, producer Bruce Timm stated that Spectrum was responsible for airbrushing Mr. Freeze's helmet in every frame that featured him. Such attention to detail ultimately drove the studio to bankruptcy; most of their staff members are now working for Production I.G.

Adaptations
The show also featured numerous adaptations of various Batman comics stories. The following episodes were adaptations:

 The episode "Appointment in Crime Alley" is based on "There Is No Hope in Crime Alley" from Detective Comics #457 (March 1976) by writer Denny O'Neil and artist Dick Giordano.
 "Dreams in Darkness" is loosely based on "Batman: The Last Arkham" from Batman: Shadow of the Bat #1–4 by writer Alan Grant and artist Norm Breyfogle (June–September 1992). This episode adapted the comic book story with the inclusion of the Scarecrow instead of Victor Zsasz and Dr. Bartholomew instead of Jeremiah Arkham.
 "The Cape and Cowl Conspiracy" was an adaptation of "The Cape and Cowl Death Trap!" from Detective Comics #450 (August 1975), written by Elliot S. Maggin and drawn by artist Walt Simonson.
 Part 1 of "Robin's Reckoning" takes its cues from "Batman and "Robin the Boy Wonder"" in Detective Comics #38 (April 1940) by writer Bill Finger, artist Bob Kane and illustrator Jerry Robinson.
 The episode "The Laughing Fish" was based on three Batman comics, blended together; "The Joker's Five-Way Revenge" from Batman No. 251 (September 1973) by Denny O'Neil with art by Neal Adams, followed by "The Laughing Fish" and "Sign of the Joker!" from Detective Comics #475–476 (February–March 1978), both by writer Steve Englehart with art by Marshall Rogers. During a spotlight podcast from Comic-Con 2007, Paul Dini explained that the reason why the episode combined those stories was that the show's creators could not adapt them separately, because their content and thematic elements would not have been cleared by the censors.
 "The Strange Secret of Bruce Wayne" was based on the comic stories "The Dead Yet Live" and "I Am the Batman!" from Detective Comics #471–472 (August–September 1977) by Steve Englehart.
 "Moon of the Wolf" is based on the comic story of the same name by writer Len Wein with art by Neal Adams, from Batman No. 255 (April 1974).
 The episode "Terror in the Sky" is loosely based on "Man-Bat Over Vegas", originally presented in Detective Comics No. 429, by writer and artist Frank Robbins. The setting has been shifted from Las Vegas to Gotham Harbor, and in keeping with the family-friendly rating of the television show, the She-Bat is not a vampire in the adaptation. The final line of the episode, "the nightmare's finally over", is similar to one of the final lines from the original comic, "Now Fran's vampire nightmare is about over".
 The episode "Almost Got 'Im" appears to be influenced by a four-issue story arc in Batman #291–294 (1977), entitled "Where Were You on the Night Batman Was Killed?".  All four stories were written by David Vern Reed and drawn by John Calnan under the direction of Batman editor Julius Schwartz. In each of the four issues, one of Catwoman, the Riddler, and the Joker all recount their claims to have killed Batman. However, the plot for "Almost Got 'Im" is quite different (six stories in the show, and four completely different ones in the comic book), with only the Joker as an overlapping antagonist.
 Two-Face's strategy in "Almost Got 'Im" (strapping down Batman to a giant coin and flipping the coin in the air) was taken from the comic World's Finest Comics No. 30 (September 1947) by writer Bill Finger and artist Bob Kane. In a backup tale, both Batman and Robin were tied to a giant penny that was catapulted onto spikes by a lesser-known villain, the Penny Plunderer. That is the same giant penny which is part of the decoration of the Batcave.
 "Off Balance" is a direct adaptation of "Batman: Into the Den of the Death-Dealers" from Detective Comics #411 (May 1971), written by writer Dennis O'Neil and drawn by artists Bob Brown and Dick Giordano. Famous for the first appearance of the mysterious character Talia.
 The two-part episode "The Demon's Quest" is a direct adaptation of "Daughter of the Demon" from Batman No. 232 (June 1971) and "The Demon Lives Again" Batman No. 244 (September 1972), written by Dennis O'Neil and drawn by artist Neal Adams. Famous for introducing one of Batman's deadlier foes; Ra's al Ghul, the father of Talia.
 The episode "Sideshow" is loosely based on "A Vow from the Grave" from Detective Comics No. 410 by writer Dennis O'Neil and artists Bob Brown and Dick Giordano. This episode adapted the comic book story with the inclusion of a separate Killer Croc story.
 "A Bullet for Bullock" is based on the comic of the same name from Detective Comics No. 651 (October 1992), by writer Chuck Dixon and artist Graham Nolan.
 The feature film Mask of the Phantasm is also an adaptation. The film's flashbacks were inspired by "Batman: Year One", whereas the character of Andrea Beaumont and the storyline itself were modified from Mike Barr's story "Batman: Year Two", which ran in Detective Comics #575–578 in the late 1980s; the villain in the comics was named the Reaper.

In other media
Sixteen minutes of animated segments in the video game The Adventures of Batman & Robin for the Sega CD are sometimes referred to as a "lost episode" of the series. These segments are intended to be interspersed between gameplay elements of an early-1990s video game and as such, the sound, color and story are not quite of the same quality of the actual television program. And because Sega did not have to follow the censorship rules of the show, the fights are also a little more violent. Many of the shows voice actors reprised their roles for the game, and are thus in the lost episode as well. Similar cutscenes appear throughout the video games Batman: Vengeance and Batman: Rise of Sin Tzu.

Feature films

 Batman: Mask of the Phantasm (1993) – based on The Animated Series; the film started production as a direct-to-video release, but was ultimately changed into a theatrical release. Although the film was not a financial success upon its initial release, it earned widespread acclaim and has since become a commercial success through its various home media releases.
 Batman & Mr. Freeze: SubZero (1998) – a direct-to-video release, which was produced as a tie-in to the 1997 film Batman & Robin. SubZeros release was delayed until the following year due to Batman & Robin failing to meet commercial and critical expectations.

Comic adaptation and novelization

The Batman Adventures

The Animated Series was accompanied by a tie-in comic book, The Batman Adventures, which followed the art style and continuity of The Animated Series instead of other Batman comic books. The Batman Adventures, through several format changes to reflect the changing world of the series and its spin-offs, outlasted the series itself by nearly a decade, finally being cancelled in 2004 to make way for the tie-in comic of the then-new, unrelated Batman animated series; The Batman. The character of Harley Quinn's first official comic appearance occurred in issue No. 12 of the series. It has become highly sought after by collectors and fans of the character.

Superman & Batman Magazine
It is a tie-in for Batman: The Animated Series and The Batman Adventures, with 8 issues published between 1993 and 1995. The stories feature the appearances of Superman and other DC characters before their appearances in the base series and spinoff television series, but otherwise unrelated to the stories in the subsequent television series.

Batman: The Adventures Continue

DC announced in February 2020 that Paul Dini, Alan Burnett and artist Ty Templeton would be leading a new miniseries, Batman: The Adventures Continue, to be first published in April 2020, based on the animated series and following shortly after its conclusion, with Tim Drake still adjusting as the new Robin to Batman.

Novels
There was also a short-lived series of tie-in novels, adapted from episodes of the series by science fiction author Geary Gravel. To achieve novel-length, Gravel combined several related episodes into a single storyline in each novel. The novels included:
 Shadows of the Past ("Appointment in Crime Alley", "Robin's Reckoning" two-parter)
 Dual to the Death ("Two-Face" two-parter, "Shadow of the Bat" two-parter)
 The Dragon and the Bat ("Night of the Ninja", "Day of the Samurai")
 Mask of the Phantasm (Batman: Mask of the Phantasm)

Broadcasting

Batman: The Animated Series premiered on the Fox Broadcasting Company's children's block Fox Kids on September 5, 1992, and aired in that block during weekday afternoons at 4:30 pm. In December, just three months after its debut, Fox also began airing episodes of the series on prime-time Sunday evenings (followed by the live-action sitcom Shaky Ground); however, the TV ratings fell short (as the show aired opposite the perennial favorite 60 Minutes), and the series was removed from this time slot in March 1993.

After the series produced its 65th episode (the minimum number necessary for a TV series to be successfully syndicated), Fox Network executives ordered a second season of 20 more episodes that was later reduced to airing weekly on Saturday mornings. The second season featured Robin more prominently and, as a result, was retitled The Adventures of Batman & Robin in the title credits; this run of episodes had two new opening sequences and ending credits. In total, the series reached 85 episodes before finishing its original run on September 15, 1995.

In 1997, following the end of Fox Kids' five-year exclusive broadcast contract, the series began airing in reruns on The WB Network's children's block Kids' WB. Later that year, The New Batman Adventures premiered on Kids' WB, airing alongside Superman: The Animated Series as part of an hour-long program titled The New Batman/Superman Adventures.

Cartoon Network aired reruns of Batman: The Animated Series from March 2, 1998, to August 18, 2004. On July 3, 2000, the series was added to Cartoon Network's Toonami line-up. In 2005, reruns of the series were aired on Cartoon Network's sister channel Boomerang.

The series later began airing on Toon Disney's Jetix line-up on September 30, 2007, again alongside Superman: The Animated Series  (despite Warner Bros. being one of Disney's biggest competitors).

The show aired on Teletoon Retro (a Canadian broadcasting channel), debuting on January 8, 2010. The first 65 episodes were confirmed, with the first being "The Cat and Claw, Part 1". The show was scheduled to air on a weekly basis, airing at 7:00 am, 6:00 pm, and midnight. All times are Eastern.

The Hub started broadcasting the series on September 6, 2011. The channel aired a 10-episode marathon of the series on July 20, 2012, to coincide with the theatrical release of The Dark Knight Rises and even created an animated version of one of the film's trailers, featuring Kevin Conroy and Adrienne Barbeau re-dubbing Batman and Catwoman's dialogue from the trailer.

Reception
Batman: The Animated Series has often been ranked as one of the greatest animated television shows ever made. It has been critically acclaimed for its mature tone, writing, voice acting, orchestrated soundtrack, visual aesthetic, and faithfulness to the source material. In 1992, Entertainment Weekly ranked the series as one of the top television series of the year. IGN.com listed the series as the best adaptation of Batman anywhere outside of comics, the best comic book television show of all time and the second-best animated series of all time (after The Simpsons). Wizard magazine also ranked it No. 2 of the greatest animated television shows of all time (again after The Simpsons). TV Guide ranked it the seventh-greatest cartoon of all time. The widespread acclaim led the series to win four Emmy Awards, including Outstanding Animated Program.

In his reference book, Batman: The Complete History, Les Daniels described The Animated Series as coming "as close as any artistic statement has to defining the look of Batman for the 1990s." Animation historian Charles Solomon gave the series a somewhat mixed assessment, commenting that "the dark, Art Deco-influenced backgrounds tended to eclipse the stiff animation and pedestrian storytelling" and concluding that the series "looked better in stills than it did on the screen."

Influence
Due to the success of Batman: The Animated Series, many crew members went on to design and produce Superman: The Animated Series for The WB. During this time they created The New Batman Adventures, which featured the same streamlined animation style as Superman: The Animated Series, as well as numerous character re-designs from the original series despite taking place in the same continuity.

In 1999, a futuristic spin-off series titled Batman Beyond premiered on The WB, featuring a teenager named Terry McGinnis taking on the duties of Batman under the guidance of an elderly Bruce Wayne. Then in 2001, the Justice League animated series premiered on Cartoon Network, featuring Batman as one of the founding members of the League. This was continued in 2004 by Justice League Unlimited, featuring a greatly expanded League. Many DC cartoons unrelated to the larger DC animated universe, such as Teen Titans and The Batman, also featured character designs strongly influenced by those of Bruce Timm.

The dramatic writing and stylized art of Batman: The Animated Series separates it from many traditional comic book-based cartoons. It can be considered the dramatic equivalent of more adult-oriented cartoon shows like The Simpsons. For this reason the show's popularity (along with that of its various spin-offs) endures among older audiences and comic book fans.

The Lego minifigures of various Batman characters are more strongly based on the designs from Batman: The Animated Series than any other form of Batman media. More precisely, the Joker, Two-Face, Poison Ivy, Mr. Freeze and Harley Quinn's minifigures seem to have identical costumes and faces to the characters from the series.

The dark atmosphere, mature themes, and even some of the voice cast from the series are employed in the Batman: Arkham video game series. Kevin Conroy, Mark Hamill, Arleen Sorkin, Robert Costanzo reprising their roles, while actors like Adrienne Barbeau and Loren Lester lent their voice to other characters. Furthermore, the first two games are co-written by series veteran Paul Dini. Also, Batman's design and costume in The Animated Series are featured as an alternate skin in Batman: Arkham City. These skins are available as downloadable content; they were also available in pre-orders at GameStop and a valid membership to Power-Up Rewards. There are also Animated-inspired alternate skins for Catwoman, Nightwing and Robin.

Actor Robert Pattinson, who portrays Batman in The Batman (2022), has cited Batman: Mask of the Phantasm as an example of Batman media that effectively captured the character's psyche in a fashion he hoped his interpretation would emulate.

Accolades

Music 

Batman: The Animated Series featured a strong musical score written by several different composers throughout the course of the series. The main theme of the show, which was heard during the opening and ending credits of each episode, was composed by Danny Elfman. At first, Elfman turned down Bruce Timm's offer to compose the theme for the show and so Timm hired Shirley Walker to do so. However, Elfman later changed his mind and composed a variation of his 1989 Batman film theme for the series. Walker's unused theme went on to become the main theme for the second season of the show, when the name was changed to The Adventures of Batman & Robin.

In 1996, Walker won her first Daytime Emmy Award for her music direction of the episode "A Bullet for Bullock" (scored by Harvey R. Cohen). She would then go on to win another Daytime Emmy Award in the category of music-composition for Batman Beyond in 2001.

Although at least twenty-four different composers worked on the series, Walker, Lolita Ritmanis, and Michael McCuistion are regarded as the main contributors. After the series finished up in 1995, the three then went on to score Superman: The Animated Series (which also featured a theme by Walker) in 1996, The New Batman Adventures in 1997 and Batman Beyond in 1999. Television composer Kristopher Carter scored alongside Walker, Ritmanis, and McCuistion throughout the many DCAU series and later filled in for Walker after her death in 2006.

Soundtracks

On December 16, 2008, La La Land Records announced the release of a soundtrack companion to Batman: The Animated Series on a two-disc CD set, which featured 11 episode scores (including those of "On Leather Wings", the "Two-Face" two-parter, "Joker's Favor" and "Perchance to Dream"). The release was limited to a pressing of 3,000 copies, which sold quickly. About one month after its release, the soundtrack set had sold over 2,500 copies. According to a spokesperson of La La Land Records, the sold out status of the soundtrack "can only help as the label hopes to convince Warner Bros. to release more Batman: The Animated Series soundtracks." The soundtrack received largely positive reviews.

On March 24, 2009, La La Land Records released the complete score for the animated film Batman: Mask of the Phantasm. It was a limited edition of 3,000 units and has since sold out.

The 2008 soundtrack was re-released in July 2012, minus "Gotham City Overture" (a suite featuring Walker's themes from the series, some of which do not appear elsewhere on the album) and "Music of the Bat 101" (a bonus track with Walker herself demonstrating the show's main music). The re-release is a limited edition of 5,000 units by La La Land Records.

On July 19, 2012, La La Land Records also released a four-disc CD set with a further 21 episode scores (including those of "Heart of Ice", the "Feat of Clay" two-parter, "Almost Got 'Im" and "The Laughing Fish"), titled Batman: The Animated Series – Original Soundtrack from the Warner Bros. Television Series, Volume Two. Volume 2 is a limited-edition release of 3,500 units by La La Land Records.

On October 7, 2014, La La Land Records released a four-disc set with another 24 episode scores (including those of the "Robin's Reckoning" two-parter, "Mudslide", "I Am the Night" and "The Man Who Killed Batman"), titled Batman: The Animated Series – Original Soundtrack from the Warner Bros. Television Series, Volume Three. Volume 3 is a limited-edition release of 3,000 units by La La Land Records.

On March 29, 2016, La La Land Records released the complete soundtrack for the animated film Batman: Mystery of the Batwoman. It was a limited edition of 2,000 units.

On July 26, 2016, La La Land Records released Batman: The Animated Series – Original Soundtrack from the Warner Bros. Television Series, Volume Four, which contains the remaining material from the first 65 episodes. The final nine episode scores from the first season are featured (including those of "Fear of Victory", "His Silicon Soul" and "Joker's Wild"), as well as never-before-released cues from scores featured on earlier volumes. Volume 4 is a limited-edition release of 3,000 units by La La Land Records.

La La Land Records is also planning to cover the later incarnations of the series (The Adventures of Batman & Robin and The New Batman Adventures) in the future, provided that sales of existing volumes are strong enough and that there is strong fan encouragement. A Superman: The Animated Series soundtrack has also been released as of January 2014, and a Justice League volume was released on July 26, 2016. Justice League Unlimited and a second volume of Superman: The Animated Series will only be released if Justice League and the first Superman: The Animated Series volume sell well.

On July 22, 2014, WaterTower Music released six digital albums on download and streaming platforms (covering La La Land's first and second volumes, including "Gotham City Overture" and "Music of the Bat 101") for the series in honor of the 75th anniversary of Batman.

Asterisked tracks contain thematic material by Shirley Walker; double-asterisked tracks contain Danny Elfman's Batman theme.

Volume 1 track listing

Gotham City Overture 14:01 (not included on the re-release)
Batman: The Animated Series – Main Title (Danny Elfman) 1:02

"On Leather Wings" (Shirley Walker):
Sub-Main Title / Batwing / Bat Attack 1:51
Batman Drives to Gotham 1:00
Batman Investigates / Batman Uses Infrared / Police Rush Building 1:48
Batman Escapes / Batman Flies 1:48
Bats / Evidence Goes Up in Smoke / The Formula / Dr. Jekyll and Mr. Bat 3:01
Gotham from the Air / Ride 'Em Batman / Epilogue 2:16

"The Last Laugh" (Shirley Walker):
Sub-Main Title 1:35
The Submarine / Joker Loots Gotham 2:35
Alfred Loses It 0:58
Bat Boat / Batman Catches the Big Fish / Batman Fights the Bad Guys 2:18
Cliff-Hanger Under Water / Batman A.K.A. Houdini 1:56
Batman the Terminator 2:01
Batman vs. Joker / Batman vs. Joker Part 2** 3:47

"It's Never Too Late" (Lolita Ritmanis):
Sub-Main Title / Stromwell's Flashback 2:01
Batman on Top of Church / Stromwell Arrives at Pete's / Thugs Exit 1:20
Stromwell Confronts Thorne 1:15
It's Party Time / Batman Carries Stromwell 0:48
Stromwell Sees Joey 1:41
Stromwell Tricks Batman / Thorne's Men Move In / Thorne Chases Stromwell 3:22
Stromwell's Flashback #2 1:45
Batman Cracks Heads / Thorne Removed 1:20

"Pretty Poison" (Shirley Walker, Lolita Ritmanis and Michael McCuistion):
Ground Breaking Ceremony / Penitentiary Time Lapses 1:11
Batman Catches a Chopper / The Chopper Crashes / Rooftop Chase 1:58
Batman Sneaks Around 1:09
A Little Plant Muzak / The Carnivorous Plant 0:59
Batman vs. Poison Ivy / Poison Ivy in Prison 3:52

"Christmas with the Joker" (Shirley Walker, Lolita Ritmanis and Michael McCuistion):
14 Seconds Opening / Jingle Bells / The Joker Blasts Off 1:03
Down the Mountain / Sidewalk Red Herring 0:51
'Pukey Christmas Music / Christmas with the Joker / Game Show Music 2:18
The Train Crashes 1:19
Observatory Cannon / Cannon Out of Control / Robin Blows Up Cannon 1:11
More Game Show Music / Drive to the Toy Company 1:39
Nutcracker Suite Medley 1:24
Pie in Batman's Face / Dangling Hostages Saved / Deck the Halls 1:40

Batman: The Animated Series – Alternate Main Title (Shirley Walker) 1:09

"Two-Face, Part I" (Shirley Walker):
Harvey's Nightmare / Dent's Soap Box 2:24
Batman Tracks Dent 2:07
Split Personality / Harvey / Harv 4:21

"Two-Face, Part II" (Shirley Walker):
Part One Recap 0:33
Sub-Main Title / The Heist 1:49
Bruce Wayne's Nightmare / Two-Face Remembers 2:47
Batcycle / What About Grace? 1:58
My Name Is Two-Face 1:52
The Great Equalizer / Where There's Love 4:03

"Joker's Favor" (Shirley Walker):
Sub-Main Title / Cussing Out the Joker / I Had a Bad Day 3:18
Joker's Hide-Out 1:19
Charlie's Neighborhood / Joker Finds Charlie 1:18
Charlie Arrives in Gotham / Joker Collects His Favor 0:42
Harley's Party Source 0:44
Crashing the Party 1:33
Batman Saves the Commissioner / Batman's After the Joker / Charlie Gets the Joker 3:38

"Vendetta" (Michael McCuistion):
Sub-Main Title / Conway Is Abducted 0:43
A Clue / The Crocodile's Lair 1:27
Another Clue 1:19
Croc's Cave / Killer Croc 2:52
Batman Chases Croc / Sewer Fight 2:54
Bullock Gets the Croc 1:09

"Perchance to Dream" (Shirley Walker):
Sub-Main Title / The Dream Begins 0:52
It's Impossible / Bruce Sees Batman / Bruce Watches Batman at Work 2:14
My Life Is a Dream 2:48
Climbing the Church Tower / Belltower Fight 2:45
Your Own Private Wonderland / Back to Reality 2:48

"Birds of a Feather" (Shirley Walker):
Birds of a Feather 1:54
That Fine Roman Nose / Penguin vs. Muggers 2:32
Penguin Takes Veronica 0:40
The Drop / Rubber Duckie Ride 1:50
The Penguin's Opera / High Society 2:19

Batman: The Animated Series – End Credit (Danny Elfman) 0:34
Music of the Bat 101 (Bonus Track) 6:45 (not included on the re-release)

Volume 2 track listing 

Batman: The Animated Series Main Title (Danny Elfman) 1:05

Beware the Gray Ghost – Carl Swander Johnson:
Beware the Gray Ghost 0:54
Simon Trent 1:47
Trent Meets Batman / Trent Runs 1:33
He Runs But He Can't Hide 0:36
Trent Helps Batman 0:55
Lethal Toys / The Ghost Saves Batman 1:25
Toy Car Chase 0:43
Gray Ghost's Shrine / Mistaken Identity 0:46
Twisted Ted / Up in Smoke 1:36
Bruce's Hero 0:31

Beware the Gray Ghost – Bonus Track:
Gray Ghost Suite 1:24

The Cat and the Claw, Part I – Harvey R. Cohen, Wayne Coster, Shirley Walker:
The Catwoman (S. Walker) 4:51
Riding the Truck* (W. Coster) 1:01
Multigon International (W. Coster) 0:18
Introducing Red Claw (H. Cohen) / A Word with the Boss (W. Coster) 0:55
Catwoman at Multigon H.Q. (S. Walker) / Cats in the Office (S. Walker) (Features "Ode to Joy" by L. Beethoven) 1:31
Batman Rescues Catwoman* (H. Cohen) / Lovers or Enemies (W. Coster) 3:33
Who Will Save You? 0:30

The Cat and the Claw, Part II – Harvey R. Cohen
The Cat and the Claw 0:44
The Train* 1:59
Bruce Wayne's Chaperone / A Bumpy Ride 1:57
Alley Cat* / Catwoman Strikes* 3:30
Bat Draft* 2:14
The Fallen Resort* 0:57
More Than You'll Ever Know* 0:46

The Cat and the Claw – Bonus Tracks:
String Quartet (W. Coster) 1:01
Ode to Joy (Composed by L. Beethoven; Arranged by Shirley Walker) 0:10
Introducing Red Claw (Alternate) (H. Cohen) 0:39
Ode to Joy Alternates (Composed by L. Beethoven; Arranged by Shirley Walker) 0:28

Nothing to Fear – Shirley Walker
Nothing to Fear 0:43
Machine Gun / The Scarecrow Arrives 1:42
The Vault** / Sprinklers 3:22
Scarecrow's Hideout 0:22
Scarecrow's Backstory 0:35
Batman's Flashback / Batman and Alfred 0:46
Scarecrow Invades the Museum / Scarecrow's Attempt at Escape** 2:13
Dirigible Flight / Fear Strikes Again / Escape and Explosion 3:22
Scarecrow Discovered / Scarecrow is Captured / Scarecrow on a Skewer 1:54

Heart of Ice – Todd Hayen, Shirley Walker
Heart of Ice 0:38
The Iceman Cometh Again / Cold as Ice* 3:30
Top Secret 0:57
The Swift Hand of Vengeance 1:55
Ice Assault / Frigid Frenzy / Alfred's Cold Remedy 2:34
Arkham Asylum 0:59

Heart of Ice – Bonus Tracks:
Newsbreak (Expanded) 0:44
Benefit Classic 1:15
Office Muzak 2:25
The Iceman Cometh Again (Alternate) 2:53
Batman: The Animated Series End Credits (Extended) (Danny Elfman) 0:46

Batman: The Animated Series Main Title (Piano Version)(Danny Elfman and Shirley Walker) 1:03

Appointment in Crime Alley – Stuart Balcomb
Sub Main Title 0:31
Batman Drives to Crime Alley / Where Are We Going to Go? 2:23
I'm Not Afraid Here* 1:12
Searching for Leslie / Leslie's Held Captive 0:49
The Billboard 0:52
Baby Picture* 1:59
Chasing the Trolley / Trolley Rescue* 1:28
Batman Sees the Newsstand Clock* / Leslie Sweats / Batman Swings During Speech 1:09
Good People in Crime Alley* 0:38

Mad as a Hatter – Harvey R. Cohen
Mad as a Hatter 1:00
Poor Jervis / Frabjous Day* 2:00
A Walk in the Park* 0:38
Ejection* / The Plunger* 1:15
The Mock Turtle Song 0:34
Until Tomorrow* / Will You, Won't You* 1:03
All's Fair in Love and War* / Mad Hatter's Friends* / Storybook Land* 3:04
Off with His Head* / The Maze* / Batman Comes to Tea* 4:15

Mad as a Hatter – Bonus Track:
Dining with Jervis 1:18

The Strange Secret of Bruce Wayne – Lolita Ritmanis
The Strange Secret* / Batman Intervenes 2:21
Tragic Past* 1:23
The Strange Doctor / The Joker's Phone Message* / Strange Has Left the Building 0:58
The Diabolical Plan* 3:07
Bruce Makes Another Tape 0:45
Strange Tries to Run / Flying the Unfriendly Skies* /Running on Empty* / Batman Makes the Catch / Robin is Revealed 3:00

I've Got Batman in My Basement – Shirley Walker, Carlos Rodriguez
The Heist 2:17
Sherman Tracks Vulture / Birdseed / Penguin Revealed 1:36
Batman Gets Gassed 2:11
Batmobile Goes Bats / Sherman and the Batmobile* (Carlos Rodriguez) 2:09
The Vulture Flies / It's a Matter of Life and Death 0:43
Vulture Attack / Penguin Pays a Visit 1:04
It's Them or Us / Polite Penguin 1:49
Penguin the Bully / Batman vs. Penguin 2:20
Front Page Penguin 0:41

Feat of Clay, Part I – Jeff Atmajian, Shirley Walker, Carl Swander Johnson
Feat of Clay* (J. Atmajian) 1:09
Mr. Fox's Resignation (S. Walker) 3:32
Matt's Make-Up (S. Walker) 1:31
Matt Finds the Formula (C. S. Johnson) 0:35
Creation of Clayface (J. Atmajian) 0:45
Bell Goes for a Ride*/** (C. S. Johnson) 1:56
Bruce Looks for Answers (J. Atmajian) 0:49
Teddy Discovers Clayface (S. Walker) 0:43

Feat of Clay, Part II – Shirley Walker
Sub Main Title 0:36
Arrival at Imperial Pictures 0:19
Man of Many Faces 2:11
Suffocation for Fox / Foiled by Batman 1:08
Batman Confronts Clayface / The Matt Hagen Films 3:09
Batman Confrontation with Clayface / Clayface Dies 4:48
The Morgue 0:50
Batman: The Animated Series End Credits (Alternate Beginning) (Danny Elfman) 0:48

Batman: The Animated Series Main Title (MIDI Version)(Danny Elfman and Shirley Walker) 1:04

Almost Got 'Im – Stuart Balcomb
Almost Got 'Im 1:24
Pumpkin Patch* / Batman's Scorn* 1:11
A Bad Penny* 1:12
Penguin's Setup* / Birds of a Feather* 2:42
Laugh O Meter / Catwoman to the Rescue* / Catwoman KO'd 1:10
Shadow Secrets* / Cat Food for Thought* / Maybe Some Day 2:08

Almost Got 'Im – Bonus Tracks:
Club Source #2 0:59
Club Source #4 0:57
Joker Talk Show Source* (Extended) 0:49
Joker Bumper* 0:15
Just for Laughs 1:40

If You're So Smart, Why Aren't You Rich? – Carlos Rodriguez
If You're So Smart, Why Aren't You Rich?*/ Silent Radio 0:45
The Wasteland*/ Rescue Attempt* / Riddler Escapes* 4:18
Minotaur's Myth* / The Griffin /Griffin Fight / Hand of Fate 3:05
Hijacked Hand* / The Minotaur / Destroy Them / Deadbolts* 3:06

If You're So Smart, Why Aren't You Rich? – Bonus Tracks:
If You're So Smart Source (Shirley Walker) 2:11
Riddle of the Minotaur Source 0:13
Griffin Theme 0:09
Question Mark Motif 0:08
Hand of Fate Motif 0:09
Wasteland Motif 0:07
Musical Puzzle 0:12

The Demon's Quest, Part I – Michael McCuistion
The Demon's Quest* 1:47
Sad News / Strike One 1:06
Calcutta / Alley Fight* 1:48
Black Cat / Sweet Dreams, Kitty* 2:03
After You 0:33
Power Trooper* / The Demon's Guard / They Call Him Ra's* 2:45
Strike Three – You're Out 0:44
The Lazarus Pit* / Revitalized Demon* 2:04

The Demon's Quest, Part II – Harvey R. Cohen
Recap* 0:52
The Demon's Quest, Part II* 1:26
Parted Lovers / Goodbye Beloved* 1:29
Orpheus / Lets Do It* / Caravan* 1:47
Pay for This Trespass 1:13
Lower the Bombs / Crazy / To the Tower 1:10
To Remember Me, Beloved* / Countdown* 1:44
He'll Ruin Everything* 3:35
Prisoner of Love* 0:57

The Laughing Fish – Shirley Walker
The Laughing Fish / Joker's Insane Scheme 3:15
Friendly Fish Truck / Missile Fish / Francis Gets Happy (Extended) / I Know You're Watching 1:13
Jackson's Cat 0:57
Oceanside Aquarium / Sharkey's Appetite 2:13
Catch of the Day / How Do You Spell Relief? 1:57
Batman Rides the Shark / Jumping Joker Sees Jaws / Is the Joker Gone? 3:30

The Laughing Fish – Bonus Tracks:
"Joker's Fish Song" (Features "Twinkle, Twinkle, Little Star" Arranged by Nerida Tyson-Chew) 1:03
Joker's Door Chime #1 0:11
Joker's Door Chime #2 0:12
Batman: The Animated Series End Credits (Alternate Ending) (Danny Elfman) 0:44

Batman: The Animated Series Main Title (with Sound Effects) (Danny Elfman) 1:04

Shadow of the Bat, Part I – Shirley Walker
Shadow of the Bat / Thorne on the Roof 2:01
Gordon's Arrest 1:02
We'll See About This / The Evidence Room 1:07
Two-Face's Hideout / The Batgirl / Batgirl Takes Action / Batgirl Gets Trashed 2:37
Bad Company / A Different Disguise / Matches Malone 3:56

Shadow of the Bat, Part II – Harvey R. Cohen
Recap* 1:19
Shadow of the Bat, Part II / Casing Gil's Apartment* 1:21
Robin and Batgirl Follow* / Matches Gives the Signal / Bad Guys Escape 2:58
Water in the Tunnel / Water, Water Everywhere* / Saving Robin / Batgirl Up the Rope* 1:47
Blasted Out of Jail / Batgirl Finds Out 1:00
Subway Escape* 1:44
Rescue of the Commish* / Batgirl's a Real Drag / Batgirl Sees the Statue* 3:16
Welcome to Gotham 0:32

Shadow of the Bat – Bonus Tracks:
Recap (Alternate) 1:20
Matches Gives the Signal (No Bass) / Bad Guys Escape (No Bass) 1:41

Harley and Ivy – Peter Davison, Michael McCuistion, Lolita Ritmanis, Shirley Walker
<li value="17">Harley and Ivy* (M. McCuistion, L. Ritmanis) 2:57
Harley is on Her Own (S. Walker, L. Ritmanis) / The Girls Escape (S. Walker) 3:18
Toxic Dump (P. Davison) / Crime Spree (S. Walker) 1:10
Batman Finds a Clue* (P. Davison) / Tie Me Up, Tie Me Down (S. Walker) / Locked in Chains (P. Davison) / Batman Escapes Bondage* (P. Davison) 1:43
The Joker's Flower (S. Walker, L. Ritmanis) / Batman Rescues Mr. J* (M. McCuistion) / No More Women (S. Walker) 2:04

Read My Lips – Shirley Walker
<li value="22">Read My Lips / Scarface's Boys 2:14
What a Dummy 1:17
Drapes for the Bat / Lumber Slumber / No Apples 2:50
A Prima Notion 1:14
Platinum Vault / Hang in There 1:24
Dummy Up / Here We Go Again 3:24

Fire from Olympus – Shirley Walker
<li value="28">Fire from Olympus 2:17
Max on High 1:16
Lightning Demonstration 0:39
Sneaking Batman In / Fire in the Sky 2:39
Batman Enters Olympus / Snake Fight 1:51
Olympus Battle 4:59
(Alternate Beginning and Ending) 1:57

Volume 3 track listing

Batman: The Animated Series Main Title – Danny Elfman 1:03

Robin's Reckoning, Part I – Carlos Rodriguez:
<li value="2">Robin's Reckoning/Yahoo!/Robin's Catch/Interrogation 2:50
Boy Wonder 0:55
Extortion/The Flying Graysons 1:49
Goodbye/Master Dick 1:03
Crap Shoot*/Stromwell's Mansion 0:59
The Bonding*/Never Again 1:00

Robin's Reckoning, Part II – Peter Tomashek:
<li value="8">Circus Memory 1:24
Fencing Memory 0:53
Dick Eavesdrops/Stealthy Dick 0:59
Dick on the Street 2:44
Dick Finds Zucco/Into the River/Out of the River 1:56
Redial (William T. Stromberg)/Batman Drops In 0:56
Amusement Park Fight/Robin Gets Zucco/Robin Does Right 3:40
Sunrise 0:34

Robin's Reckoning: Bonus Track – Carlos Rodriguez:
<li value="16">Circus Fanfare/The Flying Graysons (alternate) 1:05

P.O.V. – Shirley Walker:
<li value="17">Gotham's Finest/Bad Guys Escape 1:42
Bullock's P.O.V. 3:37
Wilkes’ P.O.V. 1:35
Montoya's P.O.V. 1:40
Suspended Cops 0:44
Renee Finds Batman/Batman Fights the Mob**/Montoya Cleans Up 5:07
Epilogue 0:27

The Clock King – Carlos Rodriguez:
<li value="24">The Clock King*/Gone with the Wind/Fugate Loses It 1:25
Political Graffiti*/Fugate Catches Train* 1:36
Back Alley Batman/Clock Creep Hits Bank/Adieu, Batman* 1:43
Time Is Running Out/Batman the Safe-Cracker 1:11
Timing Is Everything*Batman Saves the Mayor* 2:36

Tyger, Tyger – Todd Hayen:
<li value="29">Tyger, Tyger*/Introducing Tygrus 2:31
Tygrus Exercises 1:07
Dorian's Island 1:23
The Catwoman/You Made Her a Monster 0:43
Tygrus Notices Catwoman/Her Fate Is in Your Hands 1:59
Run Thru the Jungle/Bat vs. Cat/Fight on the Bridge/Batman and Tygrus Fall 2:18
Selina Convinces Tygrus/Not His Enemy 2:24
Tyger Burning Bright 1:40

See No Evil – Shirley Walker:
<li value="37">See No Evil/Memoirs of an Invisible Con/Footprints 6:09
Kimberly's School/Stay Away/Abandoned 2:59
Mojo's Pearls/Hold On... Batman 5:03
Safe and Sound 0:37

Cat Scratch Fever – Harvey R. Cohen:
<li value="1">Cat Scratch Fever/Cat Catchers/Animal Testing 3:08
Dagget Labs*/Selina Is Bitten* 0:57
The Toxin Takes Effect* 2:13
Let the Hunt Begin/The Chase Continues*/Toboggan Run 1:39
On the Ice*/Under the Ice 1:43
Bad Guys Take a Dip* 0:34
Isis’ Return 0:47

The Forgotten – Shirley Walker:
<li value="8">Down Into the City 0:37
Bruce Becomes Homeless/Bruce Is Blackjacked 2:42
The Oven 0:47
The Dream Sequence/Dan Protects Salvo/Alfred Finds Bruce's Car 2:27
Bruce's Family Flashback 0:34
Sweatbox Breakout/Trapped in the Canyon 1:21
Mining for Batman 2:52
Master Bruce 0:29

Be a Clown – Michael McCuistion:
<li value="16">Gotham Acres/Crooks Interrupt Mayor's Speech/Joker the Costume Freak* 1:59
Jekko the Magnificent/You, You, You 1:15
Pure Dynamite/Dynamite Birthday Cake* 1:51
Jordan the Stowaway 0:39
It's Not a Game, Jordan/The Old Ace Up the Sleeve/The Crystal Ball 1:43
Batman in Straightjacket/The Show Continues* 2:20
Rollercoaster Fight*  1:01
Jordan & Mayor Reunited 0:16

Be a Clown: Bonus Tracks – Michael McCuistion:
<li value="24">Organ Source 1:24
Water Tank Source 1:02
Carousel Source 1:48
Circus Source (unused) 1:45

Dreams in Darkness – Todd Hayen:
<li value="28">Dreams in Darkness/Batman Guesses Wrong/Batman Cracks Up 2:55
Batman's Fate*/Threshold of Fear 2:18
Batman Tries to Escape/Mass Madness* 0:32
Batman's Delusions* 3:46
Batman Conquers Fear*/Safe at Home 2:09

The Underdwellers – Lars Clutterham & Stuart Balcomb:
<li value="33">Let's Play Chicken (L. Clutterham) 1:10
It Was a Leprechaun (L. Clutterham) 0:48
The Underdwellers (S. Balcomb) 1:42
Blinded by the Light*/Batman Saves Frog* (S. Balcomb) 3:18
The Sewer King (S. Balcomb) 1:14
Batman Sounds Alarm (L. Clutterham) 1:27
Be Our Guest/Endangered Species? Not/Hanging Out to Dry/Batman Dethrones King (L. Clutterham) 2:14
The Light, the Light (S. Balcomb) 0:34

Terror in the Sky – Shirley Walker
<li value="41">Terror in the Sky/The Man-Bat 1:44
Carpet Inspection/Batman Operates/Francine Is in the Trash 1:01
Man-Bat Out of the Sky/Man-Bat Chases Batman 2:34
Batman Looks Thru Files/March Confesses 1:18
Francine, Come Home 0:49
Woman-Bat Wrecks the Plane/Langstrom Out the Door 2:59
Detransformation 2:21

Batman: The Animated Series Main Title Demo (Two Pianos)- Shirley Walker and Danny Elfman 1:04

Night of the Ninja – Mark Koval:
<li value="2">Night of the Ninja 2:10
Karate School/Flashback/Ninja Assault* 3:36
Just in Time 0:56
Bruce Catches Kyodai 1:13
Kidnapped/Watertower 0:39
Master Crime Fighter 1:39
Ninja Meets His Match*/Thanks for Your Help 3:18

Day of the Samurai – Carlos Rodriguez:
<li value="9">Day of the Samurai/Ninja's Arrival 1:54
Kyodai Ken Is Revealed/Bruce's Sketch 0:42
Bruce Meditates/Once Upon a Time, Alfred/Uramachi District/Batman Gives Chase 3:48
Kyodai Ken Finds Scroll/The Big Sleep/Kyodai Studies Scroll 1:37
Alfred's All Tied Up/Batman Does as He Will/Batman Examines Dummy 2:02
Batman Confronts Kyodai* 2:32
Most Ingenious, Sir/The Essence of Samurai 0:54

Prophecy of Doom – Shirley Walker:
<li value="16">Prophecy of Doom 1:19
Abandon Ship/Grave Danger 1:34
Elevator Cliffhanger/Elevator Escape 1:47
The Great Fall/Spiritual Crisis 2:33
Nostromos Sees the Light/Guilty as Charged 4:24

Prophecy of Doom: Bonus Track – Shirley Walker:
<li value="21">Nostromos Source 1:01

Eternal Youth – Lolita Ritmanis:
<li value="22">Eternal Youth 1:47
Wild Weekend/Detective Batman/Batcave Greenery 1:19
Alfred and Maggie Go Back/Batman's Chemistry/Behind the Curtain 1:40
Bat Gliding*/Petrified People 1:47
Ivy the Eco-Terrorist 1:54
What's It All About...? 0:48

Eternal Youth: Bonus Tracks – Lolita Ritmanis:
<li value="28">Video Source 2:03
Spa Source 1:51

What Is Reality? – Richard Bronskill:
<li value="30">What Is Reality?/Police Station 1:18
The Riddler's File/Robin Opens the Box 0:58
Hard Copy* 1:16
Riddler and the Commissioner*/Batman's Fire Out*/Batman in Computer Land* 1:27
Batman's Riddler* 0:56
Batman and Pegasus*/And So On, and So On 3:07
Trapped* 0:38

Mudslide – Shirley Walker
<li value="37">Mudslide/Clayface Slips By 1:17
Your Goose Is Cooked/You Used to Be Neater 3:44
Movie Source 1:15
MP-40/Clayface Escapes 1:26
He's Melting/Breaking Up Is Hard to Do 1:27
Inside Addition 4:14

I Am the Night – Michael McCuistion:
<li value="1">I Am the Night 0:37
Roses/Stakeout/Roses on the Pavement/Brass Knuckles 1:56
Battering Ram/The Jazzman Was Ready*/Catching the Jazzman/Commissioner Is Shot 2:23
Emergency 0:27
Batman Pays a Visit 0:38
Batman's Rage/Jazzman in Prison 1:25
Robin Sees Batman/Jazzman in the Laundry/Jazzman's Escape 0:58
Batman Unmasks/This Is My Hunt*/Batman Saves Gordon* 2:25
Batman Talks with Kid* 1:15

Heart of Steel, Part I – Richard Bronskill & Tamara Kline:
<li value="10">Sub-Main Title/The Briefcase (R. Bronskill) 1:03
Briefcase on the Prowl (T. Kline) 1:53
The Escape* (R. Bronskill) 3:15
Cybertron Industries/HARDAC/Next Duplicant/Another Gordon (T. Kline) 1:52
Teddy Bear/Randa's Compact/Compact Goes to Work (R. Bronskill) 1:18
Randa Finds the Batcave/HARDAC Has Control (T. Kline) 1:22

Heart of Steel, Part II – Carl Johnson:
<li value="16">Heart of Steel, Part II* 0:58
Another Mayor/Another Bullock 2:41
A Very Exclusive Club* 1:49
Trash Can Robot 1:36
A Watchful Eye/Flying Over Cybertron*/Robots Run Amok*/Randa Is Terminated 3:24
Let's Go Home* 0:39

Heart of Steel: Bonus Tracks – Tamara Kline, Richard Bronskill & Carl Johnson:
<li value="22">Futuristic Muzak (T. Kline) 0:45
Sub-Main Title/The Briefcase (alternate)/Randa's Compact (alternate) (R. Bronskill) 1:31
Let's Go Home (alternate)* (C. Johnson) 0:40

Blind as a Bat – Steve Chesne & James Stemple:
<li value="25">The Raven (S. Chesne) 1:34
Raven Runs Amok* (J. Stemple) 0:52
The Vision Thing (S. Chesne) 0:52
Sight, or No Sight/Tooling Up*/Quoth the Batman, "Nevermore"*/** (J. Stemple) 4:29
Batwing Disabled/Disabled Batman (S. Chesne) 4:05
Cornered*/Good News* (J. Stemple) 1:01

Paging the Crime Doctor – Shirley Walker:
<li value="31">Paging the Crime Doctor 3:44
Leslie Remembers/Matt Finds Leslie/Old Friends/Abducted 2:00
Signs of a Struggle/The Disorderly Orderly/Playing with Sharp Objects/Laser Blazer 4:08
Rooftop Escape/About My Father 3:28

The Man Who Killed Batman – Shirley Walker:
<li value="35">The Man Who Killed Batman 1:23
Sid Wanted In/Sid the Squid 2:27
Squid, Squid, Squid/Locked Up 1:46
Sid Meets the Joker/The Diamond Exchange/No Punchline 2:13
Batman's Funeral (includes "Amazing Grace," trad.) 3:33
Pine Box/A Lot of Respect 1:43

<li value="41">Batman: The Animated Series End Credits – Danny Elfman 0:45

Home video

VHS

United Kingdom

United States

Chinese dubbed

Spanish dubbed

DVD {{anchor|Home media|Video|DVD}}
Region 1

Warner Home Video (via DC Comics Entertainment and Warner Bros. Family Entertainment) has released Batman: The Animated Series on DVD in Region 1 in three volume box sets. A fourth volume containing all 24 episodes of The New Batman Adventures was also released and these episodes now also begin with the original Season 1 opening sequence, and also end with the standard final credits. Warner Home Video later released Batman: The Complete Animated Series, which features all episodes from both the original series and The New Batman Adventures, on DVD in Region 1. The set includes all features from the four individual volumes, plus a bonus 17th disc with a new special feature and a 40-page collector's book containing artwork. The DVD was originally on sale for a limited time only and went out of print in January 2009. Warner Home Video released a second printing of the DVD in May 2009, but then withdrew it three months later.

Region 2

Volumes 1 and 2 were released on DVD in the UK on October 10, 2005 (Volume 1), and August 21, 2006 (Volume 2). These DVD volumes were exclusive to the retail chain HMV in the United Kingdom, a complete series 25th-anniversary collection was released in the UK on October 30, 2017, containing all four volumes. Volumes 3 and 4 were previously unreleased in the UK before the 25th-anniversary box set release.On June 14, 2008, Volume 1 was re-released in the UK as a non-HMV exclusive, though both the artwork and the extras remain the same as the original HMV exclusive release. Volume 2 was released in the same way on March 3, 2009.

Region 3

In Hong Kong, the show was packaged into four different DVD volume sets just as it was done in Region 1. Volumes 1 and 2 were both released on February 28, 2005, while Volume 3 was released July 7, 2005, and Volume 4 was released February 17, 2006.

Region 4

In Australia, Volume 1 was released on October 19, 2005. Volumes and the box set are available at websites like eBay.com, Amazon.com and Quicksales.com. All four volumes are available on the Australian iTunes Store, and were released individually on DVD on November 9, 2016, by Village Roadshow.

Blu-ray
During the series's 25th anniversary panel at the New York Comic Con on October 8, 2017, it was announced that the complete series and all 24 episodes of [[The New Batman Adventures]] would be released on Blu-ray later in 2018 (due to the financial success of the Batman: Mask of the Phantasm Blu-ray release in 2017). The Blu-ray release came out in fall 2018.
The numbered, limited-edition box sets also included a code for a free digital SD and HD copy of the complete series, three collectible Funko Pocket Pops of Batman, the Joker and Harley Quinn, seven exclusive lenticular cards of original animation artwork, as well as Blu-ray copies of both spin-off animated films Mask of the Phantasm and SubZero.

Streaming

The series debuted on DC Universe in September 2018 in high definition. It moved to HBO Max on January 1, 2021.

Video games
Several video games based on the animated continuity were released during the 16-bit game-machine era, using [[The Adventures of Batman & Robin (video game)|The Adventures of Batman & Robin]] second season branding. Konami developed a game for the Super Nintendo Entertainment System (SNES), while Sega released versions of the game for the Sega Genesis/Mega Drive, Mega-CD and Game Gear. The SNES, Genesis/Mega Drive and Game Gear versions were side-scrolling action games, while the Mega-CD version featured a 3-D driving adventure. All of the games had art true to the series, while Sega's versions featured art elements directly from the show's creators. The CD version has over 20 minutes of original animated footage comparable to the most well-crafted episodes, with the principal voice actors reprising their roles.

There was also a game made for the Game Boy based on the series and created around the same time. Developed and published by Konami, this game was distinctive upon the fact that it still used the earlier [[Batman: The Animated Series (video game)|Batman: The Animated Series]] moniker instead of The Adventures of Batman & Robin second season title given to the other games.

Though not directly related, the [[Batman: Arkham]] video game series features some of the voice cast from The Animated Series returning to their roles, including Kevin Conroy as Batman and Mark Hamill as the Joker, along with Arleen Sorkin as Harley Quinn in [[Batman: Arkham Asylum]] and Robert Costanzo as Harvey Bullock in [[Batman: Arkham Origins]], while actors like Loren Lester lent their voice to other characters. Additionally, the first two games were written by Animated Series writer Paul Dini. Many of the characters' costumes from the series also appear as downloadable skins in the games.

In [[Lego DC Super-Villains]], a downloadable content level was released, based on the [[Batman: Mask of the Phantasm]] film, and contained some characters from the show, including the Batman: The Animated Series version of Batman, The Joker, Harley Quinn, Two-Face, Andrea Beaumont as The Phantasm, Mad Hatter, Man-Bat, and Captain Clown.

Cancelled spin-off 
Due to the success of the show, Fox approached Bruce Timm to make a spin-off centered on Catwoman, but the project was abandoned shortly thereafter.

See also
 [[Gotham Girls]]
 List of [[List of The New Batman Adventures episodes|The New Batman Adventures]] episodes aired from September 13, 1997

References

Bibliography {{anchor|Further reading|Books}}

 Dini, P. and Kidd, C. [[Batman Animated]], Perennial Currents, 1998.

External links

 Official website
 Official DC comics Site
 [https://web.archive.org/web/19970126204639/http://www.foxkids.com/batmnrob.htm The Adventures of Batman & Robin] at Fox Kids (Archive)
 ''Batman: The Animated Series'' at The World's Finest
 ''Batman: The Animated Series'' at Legions of Gotham
 ''Batman: The Animated Series'' at DCAU Wiki
 
 ''Batman: The Animated Series'' at Big Cartoon DataBase
 ''The Animated Batman''
 "Batmanimation" The home for all things animated Batman
 ''Batman: The Animated Series'' in Filmaffinity
 Homage to the Animated Series through the Riddler character, Flash games and animations 

 
Animated Batman television series
1990s American animated television series
1990s American crime television series
1992 American television series debuts
1999 American television series endings
Film noir cartoons
Neo-noir television series
Emmy Award-winning programs
English-language television shows
Fox Broadcasting Company original programming
Fox Kids
Kids' WB original shows
Television series by Warner Bros. Animation
Works by Len Wein
Toonami
Television shows adapted into video games
Animated thriller television series
Television series about organized crime
Television shows based on comics
Animated television shows based on DC Comics
American children's animated action television series
American children's animated adventure television series
American children's animated superhero television series
American children's animated science fiction television series
American children's animated drama television series